King Abdullah Economic City (KAEC,) is a megaproject announced in 2005 by King Abdullah bin Abdulaziz Al Saud, the former king of Saudi Arabia. 

It was one of six megaprojects that were announced in 2005 and is the only one that was launched. By 2018, The Financial Times wrote that the city had not attracted investment or become a hub for logistics and manufacturing, contrary to the grand plans behind the project. By 2018, the city had a population of 7,000.

Overview
With a total development area of 173 km² (66.8 sq mi), the city is located along the coast of the Red Sea, around 100 km north of Jeddah, the commercial hub of Saudi Arabia. The city is also approximately an hour and 20 minutes away from the city of Mecca, 3 hours from Medina by car and an hour away from all Middle Eastern capital cities by plane.
The total cost of the city is around SR 207 billion, with the project being built by Emaar Properties. A Tadawul-listed company created from Emaar Properties, a Dubai-based public joint stock company and one of the world’s largest real estate companies, and SAGIA (Saudi Arabian General Investment Authority) which is the main facilitator of the project.

The city, along with another five economic cities, is a part of an ambitious "10x10" program to place Saudi Arabia among the world's top ten competitive investment destinations by the year 2010, planned by SAGIA. The first stage of the city was completed in 2010 and the whole city was planned to be fully completed by 2020. The city aims to diversify the nation's oil-based economy by bringing direct foreign and domestic investments. The city also aspires to help create up to one million jobs. Upon completion, KAEC is intended to have a population of 2 million. By 2018, it only had a population of 7,000. The Financial Times wrote that the city served as a warning for grand megaprojects in the region, as the project fell well short of the initial grand proposals behind the project.

It is being built along with 4 other new cities in Saudi Arabia to control sprawl and congestion in existing cities.

The port of the city is part of the Maritime Silk Road that runs from the Chinese coast via the Suez Canal to the Mediterranean, there to the Upper Adriatic region of Trieste with its connections to Central and Eastern Europe.

Developments

On June 12, 2008, King Abdullah visited the city and evaluated the progress. Some of the proposed projects in the city included:
 
 Science and Research Complex
 Columbia University
 Thunderbird University
 Environment Protection Centre
 Ethraa, The Smart City
 Health Care City
 KAEC Media City
 The Cadre Technical City
 EMAL International Aluminum Smelter factory
 Total Oil factory
 Holiday Inn Express Hotel
 Ritz-Carlton Hotel & Resort

The king also inaugurated the King Abdullah University of Science and Technology (KAUST). The university is 20 km away south of the city in the village of Thuwal. It opened in September 2009.

Emaar, E.C. and SAGIA have  signed several memorandums of understanding and contracts with international and local developers in many fields. These developers include:

 Orange Business Services, is trusted advisor to the project and will oversee the design of the Smart City telecoms services.
 Ericsson, to supply, build, integrate operate and manage multiplay end-to-end fixed broadband network.
 Cisco Systems, to design infrastructure for IT networks in the city.
 GEMS World Academy, to design, build, and operate the first school in the city which will be opened by September 2009.
 StrateSphere Enterprises and PolymerOhio, to develop KAEC Plastics Valley.
 CEMCCO, to develop infrastructure for the Industrial Zone.
 DP World, to develop KAEC Sea Port to be the largest in the Red Sea and one of the top 10 largest ports in the world with a capacity to handle 20 million TEU (twenty foot equivalent container units).
 Mars GCC, to establish its own manufacturing facility in the Industrial Zone.
 Capri Capital Partners, to develop a mixed-use project with a total worth of $2 billion (SR 7.5 billion).
 Freyssinet Saudi Arabia, to develop the Business Park at Bay La Sun Village.
 Saudi Binladin Group, to construct 16 residential towers within Bay La Sun Village. The towers are scheduled for completion in September 2009.
 Siemens, to undertake the electrical transmission and distribution (T&D) works for the first phase of KAEC. The work is scheduled to be completed by 2010.

Emaar, E.C has also launched two residential areas, Bay La Sun Village, and Esmeralda Suburb.

Transport
KAEC will be served by Al-Haramain High Speed line. The construction of the station has been completed by 2018. On 25 September 2018, King Salman Bin Abdulaziz Al-Saud inaugurated the project.

In fiction
The city is the destination of Alan Clay, the protagonist in Dave Eggers's 2012 novel A Hologram for the King.

See also

 List of things named after Saudi Kings

References

External links
 
Alberini C. (2011), "Urbanistica e Real Estate. Il ruolo della finanza nei processi di trasformazione urbana", Milano, Franco Angeli Ed., Cap.5 - Nuove realizzazioni e fondi di investimento: KAEC new towns nel deserto fondate sul petrolio (pag. 125-132).

Planned cities
Economy of Saudi Arabia
Populated places in Mecca Province
Special economic zones
Planned cities in Saudi Arabia
2005 establishments in Saudi Arabia